Bernardo Correa (born 19 June 1995), is a Chilean footballer who plays as a striker for Deportes Valdivia in the Chilean Primera División.

Club career
Bernardo did all lower in Universidad Católica but his debut was in Deportes Valdivia.

External links

1995 births
Living people
Chilean footballers
Deportes Valdivia footballers
Club Deportivo Universidad Católica footballers
Association football forwards